Whitlock is a surname of Old English origin, meaning “white enclosure” from Old English hwit “white” and locc “lock, enclosure”. The name also means "white hair" in Old English. Notable people with the name include:

 Albert Whitlock (1915–1999), English motion picture matte artist
 Anna Whitlock (1852–1930), Swedish feminist
 Barbara Ann Whitlock (born 1967), American botanist
 Billy Whitlock (1813–1878), American blackface performer
 Bobby Whitlock (born 1948), American session musician
 Brand Whitlock (1869–1934), American municipal reformer, diplomat, journalist, and author
 David W. Whitlock (born 1962), American university president, author, Baptist minister
 E. Florence Whitlock (1889-1978) British composer, conductor, and educator
 Ed Whitlock (1931–2017), English-Canadian long distance runner
 Elizabeth Whitlock (1761–1836), British stage actress
 Garrett Whitlock (born 1996), American baseball player
 Harold Whitlock (1903–1985), British Olympic athlete in the 1936 Olympics
 Isiah Whitlock Jr. (born 1954), American actor
 Jason Whitlock (born 1967), American sportswriter and radio personality
 Jeremy Whitlock (born 1965), reactor physicist
 Ken Whitlock (1920–2012), American football player
 Lee Whitlock (born 1968), British television actor
 Max Whitlock (born 1993), British artistic gymnast, 2 times world champion and 2 times olympic gold medallist
 Percy Whitlock (1903–1946), English organist and composer
 Phil Whitlock (footballer) (1930–2009), Welsh footballer
 Phil Whitlock (squash player) (born 1962), English squash player
 Simon Whitlock, (born 1969), Australian darts player
 Tom Whitlock (born 1954), songwriter and lyricist
 William Whitlock (disambiguation)

See also
Whitelocke